Projection effect may refer to:

 Front projection effect, in-camera visual effect
 Rear projection effect, in-camera visual effect
 Insolation#Projection effect, the amount of sunlight onto a portion of the Earth relative to its tilt
 In astronomy, a type of observational illusion caused by viewing distant objects or phenomenon from a particular perspective. Examples include superluminal motion, the retrograde motion of the planets, and optical double stars.

See also
 Projection (disambiguation)
 Effect (disambiguation)